Ken Myhr is a Canadian musician and composer. He is most noted for his work on the film The Accountant of Auschwitz, for which he won the Canadian Screen Award for Best Music in a Non-Fiction Program or Series at the 8th Canadian Screen Awards in 2020.

Myhr first became noted as a session musician, most notably as a guitarist for Jane Siberry and Cowboy Junkies. He had his first credit as a composer on the 1994 short film Arrowhead, and his first feature film credit on the 1996 film Not Me! (Sous-sol). His later credits have included the films Project Grizzly, The Herd, Herman's House, The World Before Her, Driving with Selvi and Migrant Dreams.

He was previously a Canadian Screen Award nominee at the 1st Canadian Screen Awards in 2013 for his work on The Market, and a four-time Gemini Award nominee for his work on Geologic Journey II: The Pacific Rim, Love at the Twilight Motel, The Real Sherlock Holmes and Herman's House.

References

External links

20th-century Canadian composers
20th-century Canadian guitarists
21st-century Canadian composers
21st-century Canadian guitarists
Canadian film score composers
Canadian television composers
Musicians from Toronto
Canadian Screen Award winners
Living people
Year of birth missing (living people)